Almore Charles "Buff" Wagner (May 31, 1897 – February 12, 1962) was a professional football player for the Green Bay Packers in 1920 and 1921. He played at the collegiate level at Carroll University.

Biography
Wagner was born Almore Charles Wagner on May 31, 1897 in Marinette, Wisconsin. He died on February 12, 1962.

References

1897 births
1962 deaths
Green Bay Packers players
Carroll University alumni
People from Marinette, Wisconsin
Players of American football from Wisconsin